Love Love Love may refer to:

Film, TV and theatre
 Love Love Love (1989 film), a Bollywood film
 Love, Love, Love (1974 film), a Taiwanese film
 Love Love Love (2017 film), a Nepalese film
 "Love, Love, Love" (Glee), an episode of Glee
 Love Love Love (play), a 2010 play by Mike Bartlett

Music

Albums
 Love Love Love (Linda Chung album), 2012
 Love Love Love (Roy Kim album), 2013

Songs
 "Love Love Love" (Agnes song), 2009
 "Love Love Love" (Avalanche City song), 2010
 "Love, Love, Love" (James Blunt song), 2008
 "Love Love Love/Arashi ga Kuru", a 1995 single by Japanese band Dreams Come True
 "Love Love Love" (Lenny Kravitz song), 2008
 "Love Love Love" (Webb Pierce song), 1955, written by Ted Jarrett
 "Love Love Love", a song by After School from the 2010 album Happy Pledis 1st Album
 "Love, Love, Love (Love, Love)", a song by As Tall As Lions from the 2006 album As Tall As Lions
 "Love, Love, Love", a song by Joe Beats
 "Love Love Love", a song by Chilly
 "Love, Love, Love", a song by Epik High from the 2007 album Remapping the Human Soul
 "Love Love Love", a song by F.T. Island
 "Love, Love, Love", a song by Donny Hathaway
 ”Love Love Love”, a song by Bobby Hebb
 "Love Love Love", a single by Ken Hirai from the 2000 album The Changing Same
 "Love Love Love", a song by Of Monsters and Men from the 2011 album My Head Is an Animal
 "Love Love Love", a song by The Mountain Goats from the 2005 album The Sunset Tree
 "Love Love Love", a song by The Queers from the 1990 album Grow Up
 "Love Love Love", a song by Secret Life
 "Love Love Love", a song by Sinitta from the 1989 album Wicked
 "Love Love Love", a song by Jolin Tsai from the 2004 album Castle
 "Love Love Love", a song by Pere Ubu from the 1989 album Cloudland

See also
 "It's Love-Love-Love", a 1944 song popularized by Guy Lombardo